Narain Krishna Rao Shejwalkar (1923–2000)  was member of Lok Sabha from Gwalior. He was elected to 6th and 7th Lok Sabha from Gwalior (Lok Sabha constituency). He also served as member of Rajya Sabha. He was Mayor of Gwalior Municipal Corporation during 1970–71.

His son Vivek Shejwalkar was elected to 17th Lok Sabha from Gwalior (Lok Sabha constituency) in 2019. He was also a Mayor of Gwalior Municipal Corporation.

References

2000 deaths
1923 births
People from Gwalior
India MPs 1977–1979
Lok Sabha members from Madhya Pradesh
Bharatiya Jana Sangh politicians
Indians imprisoned during the Emergency (India)
Rajya Sabha members from Madhya Pradesh
Mayors of places in Madhya Pradesh
20th-century Indian lawyers
India MPs 1980–1984
Bharatiya Janata Party politicians from Madhya Pradesh
Janata Party politicians